Dog Daze is a 1937 Warner Bros. Merrie Melodies directed by Friz Freleng and animated by Robert McKimson. The short was released on September 18, 1937.

Plot
A bunch of dogs and their owners are all heading to the dog show. First, a few owners that resemble their dogs are shown before heading inside to take a closer look. At first, a really big woman comes in to find a seat. She pushes her way through the row but by the time she finds a seat, all of the guys have been forced to the ground.

Then we get to have a closer look at all the dogs in another room, being judged and looked over. There's a bird dog, a doggy that whistles while sitting in his cage. We also see an Irish setter over looking its babies that hatched from eggs, A police dog yelling things, the spitz, and a St. Bernard Booze Hound that howls a song while hiccuping. The last dog is a hot dog.

Now back on the show, a stage light is going over dog ads like asbestos dog biscuits, itching canine art galleries, K-9 kennel, and so on and so on. And then it is time for the show to begin.

First to perform, The Scotties. Which are two Scottish dogs dancing a Scottish dance. Then the Russian Wolf Hounds, who also do a dance after showing how skinny/thin they are. At the end of their dance it reveals there are two little black dogs on their heads and all four run off stage. The next act, titled "Dog Eat Dog" involves a dog eating the Hot Dog from earlier. Next comes "Little Man You've Had A Busy Day", involving an adorable little puppy sitting there.

The Prairie Dogs perform next but it turns out their not really dogs, not that they mind. They stand there and perform a song anyway. As they do, the drunk dog from earlier howls along until a muzzle is shoved on his face. While trying to yank it off, the booze hound accidentally falls into a box of skates and begins to skate around. He incidentally interrupts the Prairie dogs as they perform. Then the next act involves a very shy puppy that didn't want to perform the poem its owner gave it. It criticizes the poem but continues anyway despite the many distractions. Like the booze hound accidentally releasing a whole bunch of fleas on the poor puppy. The puppy continues reciting the poem, its voice much quicker and high-pitch until it runs off stage.

Meanwhile, the booze hound is still recovering when he notices a bunch of flees have gotten into his alcohol, having drunk a whole bunch of it. A group of fleas sing while hiccuping every so often, then finally they all lay down as the cartoon ends.

References

External links

Merrie Melodies short films
Warner Bros. Cartoons animated short films
1937 animated films
American black-and-white films
Short films directed by Friz Freleng
Films scored by Carl Stalling
1937 films
Animated films about dogs
1930s Warner Bros. animated short films